= Victor Abraham Goldman =

- Born: 1903
- Died: 1993

Victor Abraham Goldman (1903-1993) was a British anaesthetist, who highlighted the importance of monitoring during anaesthesia.
